The orthogonal Procrustes problem is a matrix approximation problem in linear algebra. Specifically,

where  denotes the Frobenius norm.  This is a special case of Wahba's problem (with identical weights; instead of considering two matrices, in Wahba's problem the columns of the matrices are considered as individual vectors). Another difference is, that Wahba's problem tries to find a proper rotation matrix, instead of just an orthogonal one.

The name Procrustes refers to a bandit from Greek mythology who made his victims fit his bed by either stretching their limbs or cutting them off.

Solution 
This problem was originally solved by Peter Schönemann in a 1964 thesis, and shortly after appeared in the journal Psychometrika.

This problem is equivalent to finding the nearest orthogonal matrix to a given matrix , i.e. solving the closest orthogonal approximation problem
. 

to write

Proof 

One proof depends on basic properties of the Frobenius inner product that induces the Frobenius norm:

This quantity  is an orthogonal matrix (as it is a product of orthogonal matrices) and thus the expression is maximised when  equals the identity matrix . Thus

where  is the solution for the optimal value of  that minimizes the norm squared .

Generalized/constrained Procrustes problems 
There are a number of related problems to the classical orthogonal Procrustes problem.  One might generalize it by seeking the closest matrix in which the columns are orthogonal, but not necessarily orthonormal.

Alternately, one might constrain it by only allowing rotation matrices (i.e. orthogonal matrices with determinant 1, also known as special orthogonal matrices).  In this case, one can write (using the above decomposition )

For more information, see the Kabsch algorithm.

See also 
 Procrustes analysis
 Procrustes transformation
 Wahba's problem
 Kabsch algorithm
 Point set registration

References 

Linear algebra
Matrix theory
Singular value decomposition